Sloanoglymmius is a genus of wrinkled bark beetles in the family Carabidae. Sloanoglymmius planatus, found in Australia, is the only species of this genus.

References

Rhysodinae